A grant of appellate review is dismissed as improvidently granted when a court with discretionary appellate jurisdiction later decides that it should not review the case. Notably, the Supreme Court of the United States occasionally grants a petition of the writ of ceriorari, only to later DIG the case.

Supreme Court of the United States 

The Supreme Court normally DIGs a case through a per curiam decision, usually without giving reasons, but rather issuing a one-line decision: "The writ of certiorari is dismissed as improvidently granted." However, justices sometimes file separate opinions, and the opinion of the Court may instead give reasons for the DIG.

A DIG can come as a surprise or disappointment to parties who have put significant effort into getting a case to the Court, to third parties who have filed amicus briefs to express their views to the Court, or to members of the public expecting resolution of a high-profile dispute. However, respondents who had urged the Court not to take a case in the first place may seek to convince the Court to DIG the case, leaving their lower-court victory in tact and avoiding a potentially unfavorable precedent.

In most cases, the reasons for a DIG fall into three main categories:
 First, the most common reason for a DIG is that the Court discovers that the case is a "poor vehicle" for resolving the question presented. That is, there may be difficult threshold issues that the Court would have to be decide before getting to the issue that the Court agreed to review.
 Second, the Court also may DIG a case when it believes the petitioner has engaged in a "bait-and-switch," pressing new arguments or issues that were not the focus of the cert petition or the question upon which the Court granted review.
 Third, the Court sometimes DIGs cases where it is unable to agree on a clear resolution for the case, and decides to issue no decision rather than a fractured or muddled decision.

It has not always been clear how many votes are needed to DIG a case. By custom, it takes only four votes to grant certiorari, not a majority of five, so it has been suggested that six votes should be required to DIG a case (i.e., four justices could insist on keeping the case). Nevertheless, the Supreme Court has DIGged some cases over four justices' dissent, such as Medellin v. Dretke (2005), Robertson v. United States ex rel. Watson (2010), and Boyer v. Louisiana (2012).

Because per curiam opinions are issued from the Court as an institution, these opinions lack the attribution of who authored or joined the decision. Sometimes, the Supreme Court DIGs a case through a simple docket order, rather than issuing even a per curiam opinion. (See Other Cases below.) Accordingly, the lists below may not include every case with a DIG.

DIGs after oral argument since Term 1989

Other Cases Dismissed as Improvidently Granted since 2001 

The following cases were dismissed as improvidently granted by the Court through a docket order rather than a published opinion. The Supreme Court's online docket search system "contains complete information regarding the status of cases filed since the beginning of the 2001 Term." Orders from before 2001 may appear instead in the United States Reports.

See Also 
 Procedures of the Supreme Court of the United States

Notes

References

Further reading 
 

Supreme Court of the United States